Kepala Batas (Jawi: كڤالا باتس) is the district seat of North Seberang Perai, Penang, Malaysia.

Notable people 
Politicians & Public Servants
 Tun Dato' Sri Haji Abdullah bin Haji Ahmad Badawi, 5th Prime Minister of Malaysia (31 October 2003 – 3 April 2009) 
 Tun Dato' Seri Utama Haji Abdul Rahman Abbas, 7th Yang di-Pertua Negeri (the Head of the State/ the Supreme Head of the State) of the state of Penang, Malaysia. (2001–2021). 
 Tan Sri Nor Mohamed Yakcop, former Malaysian Minister in the Prime Minister's Department and Minister of Finance II.
 Datuk Seri Reezal Merican bin Naina Merican, Minister of Housing and Local Government. Member of the Parliament of Malaysia for the seat of Kepala Batas in the state of Penang.
 The Honourable Datuk Siti Mariah binti Haji Ahmad is the current High Court Judge of Kuala Lumpur. She was also appointed as Judicial Commissioner on 1 May 2003

References

North Seberang Perai District
Towns in Penang